(both meaning 'peak of the three languages'), is a minor summit of the Ortler Alps, located on the border between Switzerland and Italy. The summit is the tripoint between the Italian regions of Lombardy and South Tyrol and the Swiss canton of Graubünden. Before World War I it was the international tripoint of Switzerland, the Kingdom of Italy and Austria-Hungary. 
The Romansh and German names refer to the encounter of different linguistic areas in this region. The Italian name refers to Giuseppe Garibaldi, however losing the reference to the meeting of different cultures.

On its southern side the mountain overlooks the Stelvio Pass.

References

External links

 Piz da las Trais Linguas on Hikr

Mountains of the Alps
Italy–Switzerland border
International mountains of Europe
Mountains of Graubünden
Mountains of Lombardy
Mountains of South Tyrol
Ortler Alps
Mountains of Switzerland
Two-thousanders of Switzerland
Val Müstair